Mikhail Krasnov (died November 1979) was an international speedway rider from the Soviet Union.

Speedway career
Krasnov was a leading Soviet Union international during the early 1970s reaching the final of the Speedway World Championship in the 1974 Individual Speedway World Championship. He was also part of the Soviet Union team that reached the World Cup Final.

He died in November 1979.

World final appearances

Individual World Championship
 1974 –  Gothenburg, Ullevi – 14th – 3pts

World Team Cup
 1974 -  Chorzów, Stadion Śląski, Chorzów (with Valery Gordeev / Viktor Kalmykov / Anatoly Kuzmin) - 4th - 10pts

References

1979 deaths
Year of birth missing
Russian speedway riders